Microcharis is a genus in the tribe Indigofereae of the family Fabaceae.

Species
Microcharis comprises the following species:

 Microcharis ammophila (Thulin) Schrire
 Microcharis angolensis Baker
 Microcharis annua (Milne-Redh.) Schrire
 Microcharis aphylla (R.Vig.) "Schrire, Du Puy & Laba"
 Microcharis asparagoides (Taub.) Schrire
 Microcharis brevistaminea (J.B.Gillett) Schrire
 Microcharis buchneri (Taub.) Schrire
 Microcharis butayei (De Wild.) Schrire
 Microcharis cana (Thulin) Schrire
 Microcharis contorta (J.B.Gillett) Schrire
 Microcharis cufodontii (Chiov.) Schrire
 Microcharis disjuncta (J.B.Gillett) Schrire
 var. disjuncta (J.B.Gillett) Schrire
 var. fallax (J.B. Gillett) Schrire
 Microcharis ephemera (J.B.Gillett) Schrire
 Microcharis galpinii N.E.Br.
 Microcharis garissaensis (J.B.Gillett) Schrire
 Microcharis gyrata (Thulin) Schrire
 Microcharis karinensis (Thulin) Schrire
 Microcharis kucharii (Thulin) Schrire
 Microcharis latifolia Benth.
 Microcharis longicalyx (J.B.Gillett) Schrire
 Microcharis medicaginea (Baker) Schrire
 Microcharis microcharoides (Taub.) Schrire
 var. latistipulata (J.B. Gillett) Schrire
 var. microcharoides (Taub.) Schrire
 Microcharis nematophylla Thulin
 Microcharis phyllogramme (R.Vig.) "Schrire, Du Puy & Laba"
 Microcharis praetermissa (Baker f.) Schrire

 Microcharis remotiflora (Baker f.) Schrire
 Microcharis sessilis (Thulin) Schrire
 Microcharis spathulata (J.B.Gillett) Schrire
 Microcharis stipulosa (Chiov.) Schrire
 Microcharis tenella Benth.
 Microcharis tenuirostris (Thulin) Schrire
 Microcharis tisserantii (Pellegr.) Schrire
 Microcharis tritoides (Baker) Schrire
 subsp. obbiadensis (Chiov.) Schrire
 subsp. tritoides (Baker) Schrire
 Microcharis wajirensis (J.B.Gillett) Schrire
 Microcharis welwitschii (Baker) Schrire

Species names with uncertain taxonomic status
The status of the following species is unresolved:
 Microcharis omissa Thulin

References

External links

Indigofereae
Fabaceae genera